Paipa is a town and municipality in the Tundama Province, a part of the Colombian department of Boyacá. Paipa borders Duitama, Firavitoba, Tibasosa, Sotaquirá and Tuta.

Geography 
It is the main tourist center of the region, with a number of large hotels and hot springs. At an elevation of 2525 m, the climate is mild with an average of 14° Celsius.

Climate

Etymology 
Paipa is named after the cacique (leader) of the Paipa people.

History 
Before the Spanish conquest in the 1530s, Paipa was inhabited by the Muisca people. The loose Muisca Confederation comprised different rulers; the cacique of Paipa was loyal to the Tundama of Tundama. Conquistador Gonzalo Jiménez de Quesada visited Paipa in 1539 in his search for the Sun Temple.

Modern Paipa was founded on February 19, 1602, by Luís Enríquez.

Paipa's first building was the church, built where the cathedral stands today, with clay tile, walls, and stone foundations. Initially, it served as a headquarters for police and justice services, and also for tax collection in Paipa and surrounding villages.

On November 4, 1755, Paipa was designated as a Corregimiento, and Don Ignacio de Caicedo was named as first Corregidor.  In 1758 he appointed Juan Avellaneda, Miguel Rodriguez and Esteban Lara as the first mayor of Paipa. The municipality boundaries of Paipa were demarcated in 1778.

The first event that led to Paipa's reputation as a tourist city was the arrival of specialists in 1825 to analyze the local mineral waters. Tourist activity began to pick up after 1852 when the central government sent a natural resources committee headed by General Agustín Codazzi.

The construction of the current cathedral in Jaime Rook park began in 1906 and was finished in 1920. The first passenger trains arrived from Bogota in late 1930 and early 1931. Mineral water pools and spas were built in 1938, launching the local tourist industry, which was reinforced by the construction of Lake Sochagota in 1955. In 1960, the Departmental Assembly declared Paipa a "tourist capital."

The construction of the first local coal-fired power-plant in 1953 led to an influx of population from elsewhere in the country.  Some of Paipa's historical architecture has been lost as the city has grown, and the traditional colonial main square has given way to modern buildings.

Paipa inaugurated the monument to the Lancers at the Pantano de Vargas, and the now forgotten monument to Innocent Chincá on North Central Avenue. In this decade, the hospitality industry around the lake began to develop with the first Sochagota Springs Hotel. Before these buildings and municipal swimming pools were built, the only opportunity for residents and tourists to bathe in the hot springs was at a Victorian hotel located in urban Paipa. New urban public venues for music have recently been constructed, such as Concha Acústica "Valentín Garcia", a sports and cultural complex built in 1990.

By 1995 Paipa, like other neighboring cities across Colombia, began to experience urban decay due to national policies seeking to quickly industrialize and urbanize Colombia. In response to this, new housing developments are under construction in the north side of the city.

Economy 
Paipa's main economic activities are tourism and agriculture, with livestock and dairy farms as well as farms producing oats, barley, maize, wheat, and potatoes. The coal-fired TermoPaipa power plant serves the entire region.

The city is served by Juan José Rondón Airport.

Tourism 
Places of interest include: Lake Sochagota, the Ranchería nature reserve, the Vargas swamp, the church, the Casona del Salitre and Jaime Rook park, named in honor of James Rooke.

Lake Sochagota 
Lake Sochagota is a destination for Colombians and has started to attract foreign visitors. Activities include water-skiing, kayaking, as well as running and cycling around its edge.

Vargas Swamp 
Vargas Swamp is the location of the Battle of Vargas Swamp which took place on the 25th of July 1819 and was decisive in the fight for independence. A monument to the 14 lancers, by Rodrigo Arenas Betancur, commemorates the battle.

Paipa thermal baths 
The thermal bath area covers approximately 5 hectares and includes a number of pools, both public and private, as well as hotels, sports facilities, shops and cafes. The water comes from a subterranean lake whose waters come to the surface in this area, before being distributed by pipes to various establishments in the sector.

Casona del Salitre 
Just outside the town is the Casona de Salitre, a restored colonial hacienda, which is a national monument as well as a hotel.

Notable people from Paipa 
 Ángel Camargo, former professional cyclist
 Fernando Camargo, professional cyclist
 Wilson Cepeda, professional cyclist
 Flober Peña, former professional cyclist

Gallery

References 

Municipalities of Boyacá Department
Populated places established in 1602
1602 establishments in the Spanish Empire
Muisca Confederation
Muysccubun